This is a list of songs whose lyrics and themes are about close encounters with extraterrestrial aliens.

1950s
"The Flying Saucer Parts 1 & 2" by  Bill Buchanan and Dickie Goodman
"My Flying Saucer" lyrics by Woodie Guthrie 1950; recorded later by Billy Bragg and Wilco† 
"The Purple People Eater" by Sheb Wooley
"Two Little Men In A Flying Saucer" by Ella Fitzgerald
 "Flyin' Saucers Rock & Roll" by Billy Lee Riley and Jerry Lee Lewis

1960s
"Let There Be More Light" by Pink Floyd
"Mr. Spaceman" by The Byrds 
"Set the Controls for the Heart of the Sun" by Pink Floyd
"Voices Green and Purple" by The Bees
"It Came Out of the Sky" Creedence Clearwater Revival 
"Have You Seen the Saucers" by Jefferson Airplane

1970s
"After the Gold Rush" by Neil Young 
"Calling Occupants of Interplanetary Craft" by Klaatu (cover by The Carpenters†)
"Childhood's End" by Pink Floyd
"Come Sail Away" by Styx†
"Here Come the Martian Martians" by Jonathan Richman and the Modern Lovers 
"Horsell Commons and the Heat Ray" by Jeff Wayne (Jeff Wayne's Musical Version of The War of the Worlds) 
"I've Seen the Saucers" by Elton John
"Longer Boats" by Cat Stevens 
"Martian Boogie" by Brownsville Station 
"Mothership Connection" by Parliament 
"Starman" by David Bowie 
"Starship Trooper" by Yes
"Arriving UFO" by Yes 
"Waiting for the UFOs" by Graham Parker 
"Silver Lights" Sammy Hagar 
"UFO" by Johnny Rivers

"Children of the Sun" Billy Thorpe 
"Starrider" by Foreigner 
"Strange Ships" by Fox

1980s
"Fire Of Unknown Origin" by Blue Öyster Cult
"Books about UFOs" by Hüsker Dü
"Flying Saucers" by Nina Hagen
"Love Walks In" by Van Halen
"Loving the Alien" by David Bowie
"No Doubt About It" by Hot Chocolate
"Nobody Told Me" by John Lennon
"Rapture" by Blondie
"Zero Zero UFO" by The Ramones
"I Ran (So Far Away)" by A Flock of Seagulls
"Caught in the Crossfire" by April Wine

1990s
"The Alien Song (For Those Who Listen)" by Mila Jovovich
"El Aparato ("The Apparatus")" by Café Tacvba
"Alien (I Am)" by Hawkwind 
"Aliens Exist" by Blink-182 
"Alien Visitors" by Man or Astro-man? 
"Another Sunday" by I Mother Earth 
"Fell in Love with an Alien" by the Kelly Family
"Hangar 18" by Megadeth
"Hat Too Flat" by Walter Becker 
"I Made Love to a Martian" by Mustard Plug 
"Martian Dance Invasion" by Brainiac 
"Motorway to Roswell" by Pixies 
"Scent of a Mule" by Phish
"Shades of Grey" by Stuart Davis 
"Spaceman" by Babylon Zoo
"Subterranean Homesick Alien" by Radiohead†
"The Happening" by Pixies 
"Who's There?" by Smash Mouth

"Spaceman" by Bif Naked

2000s to present

 "The Aliens Are Here" by The Hippos, 2000
"And You Thought the Doctor's Probe Hurt" by Belvedere, 2002
"Jaadoo, Jaadoo" by Rajesh Roshan (on Koi... Mil Gaya soundtrack), 2003
"Concerning the UFO sighting near Highland, Illinois" by Sufjan Stevens on Illinois, 2005
"Aliens" by Doctor Octagon, 2006
"UFO"† by Sneaky Sound System, 2006
"Rosetta Stoned", by Tool on 10,000 Days, 2006
"We're Not Alone" by Nas on Untitled Nas album, 2008
"Spaceman" by The Killers, 2008
"Venus Ambassador" by Bryan Scary & The Shredding Tears, 2009
"E.T." by Katy Perry, featuring Kanye West, 2010
"Zopilotes" ("Black Vultures") by Café Tacuba on El Objeto Antes Llamado Disco, 2012
"Ancient Aliens" by Lemon Demon on Spirit Phone, 2016
"Hey Aliens" by The Bouncing Souls on Simplicity, 2016
"Spaceship" by Kesha, 2017
"Herd Culling" by Porcupine Tree on CLOSURE/CONTINUATION, 2022

Notes
† Bumper music on StarTalk UFO episode

References

Further reading

Close encounters with aliens
Extraterrestrial life in popular culture